William Gloyd Martin (February 13, 1894 – September 14, 1949) was a Major League Baseball player. After Martin's baseball career ended he founded Martin's Tavern in the Georgetown neighborhood of Washington, D.C.

Martin was born in Washington, D.C. and died in Arlington, Virginia.

References

External links

Major League Baseball shortstops
Boston Braves players
Syracuse Stars (minor league baseball) players
Shreveport Gassers players
Petersburg Goobers players
Tarboro Tarbabies players
Wilson Bugs players
Bridgeport Bears (baseball) players
Minor league baseball managers
Baseball players from Washington, D.C.
1894 births
1949 deaths